University Institute of Applied Management Sciences (commonly known as UIAMS Chandigarh), established in 2008 under the aegis of the Panjab University, offers management education to professional managers as specialized full-time MBA programmes. It is one of the business schools in India which started offering sectoral MBA programmes supplemented with specialization in core functional areas of management. Launched by the Faculty of Business Management & Commerce of Panjab University in 2008, it has since significantly expanded its number of management courses.

Courses

UIAMS offers the following courses. Sectoral MBA programmes are supplemented with specialization in core functional areas of management including marketing, finance, human resources and operations.

 MBA (Banking and Insurance)
 MBA (Hospital Management)
 MBA (Infrastructural Management)
 MBA (Pharmaceutical Management)
 MBA (Retail Management)
 MBA (IT & Telecommunications)
 MBA (Capital Market)
 PHD

MBA sectoral
MBA sectoral at UIAMS Chandigarh is a two-year course. The curriculum for MBA sectoral consists of 70 per cent management and 30 per cent industry sector specific inputs. Students are given training offers with stipend by various leading companies during the course. UIAMS is also well known for great job placement opportunities by reputed companies of its students with annual job packages starting from average - to highest . UIAMS has internationally recognized faculty members.

Student Life and Participation
The student life at UIAMS is full of activities that stretch well beyond the classroom as they involve themselves in the various student's activities as well as contribute to the institute. As a Full Time MBA student at UIAMS, one gets an opportunity to join the different student run bodies E-Cell, PR cell, UIAMS Management Club etc., which coordinates several activities on campus. UIAMS have academic exchange programme with Nottingham Trent University, UK. UIAMS annually organizes three day Management cum Academic fest PRAZNIK and quiz event Spellecrama at university campus. SAMYUKT is the annual alumni meet event at UIAMS. There are regular Seminars, interactive sessions, expert talks by eminent personalities are conducted on campus. Each academic session is started with an orientation programme where successful entrepreneurs and business leaders share their success mantras with freshers. In 2009 and 2017, MBA students of UIAMS department were elected president of Panjab University Campus Students Council.

References

External links
 Official Website of UIAMS, Chandigarh

Business schools in Punjab, India
Panjab University
Universities in Chandigarh
Educational institutions established in 2008
University departments in India
2008 establishments in Chandigarh